The 2021–22 Yale Bulldogs men's basketball team represented Yale University in the 2021–22 NCAA Division I men's basketball season. The Bulldogs, led by 22nd-year head coach James Jones, played their home games at John J. Lee Amphitheater of the Payne Whitney Gymnasium in New Haven, Connecticut, as members of the Ivy League. They finished the season 19–12, 11–3 in Ivy League play to finish in second place. As the No. 2 seed, they defeated Penn and Princeton to win the Ivy League tournament. They received the conference’s automatic bid to the NCAA tournament as the No. 14 seed in the East Region, where they lost in the first round to Purdue.

Previous seasons
Due to the COVID-19 pandemic, the Ivy League chose not to conduct a season in 2020–21. 
The 2019–20 Bulldogs' team went 23–8 and won the Ivy League regular season title. The Ivy League tournament was canceled on March 10 and Yale was awarded the league's automatic bid to the NCAA tournament, which was canceled on March 11.

Roster

Schedule and results

|-
!colspan=12 style=| Non-conference regular season

|-
!colspan=12 style=| Ivy League regular season

|-
!colspan=12 style=| Ivy League tournament
|-

|-
!colspan=9 style=|NCAA tournament

Source

References

Yale Bulldogs men's basketball seasons
Yale
Yale
Yale Bulldogs men's basketball
Yale Bulldogs men's basketball